Bushi and similar can refer to:

People
Alban Bushi (born 1973), Albanian footballer
Bushi Moletsane (born 1984), Mosotho footballer
Bushi (wrestler) (born 1983), Japanese professional wrestler

Other uses
Bushi (music), a genre of Japanese folk music
Bushi (region), a region in the Democratic Republic of the Congo
Bushi (warrior), the Japanese word for "warrior" often used to refer to Samurai
Bushi language, a language of Madagascar and Mayotte
Bushi Station, a railway station Iruma, Saitama, Japan

See also
Bushie, a derogatory statement for an American political supporter of George H. W. Bush, George W. Bush, or Jeb Bush
Bushey, a town in Hertfordshire in England
Bushy (disambiguation)